Ethylmagnesium bromide is a Grignard reagent with formula C2H5MgBr. It is widely used in the laboratory synthesis of organic compounds.

Reactions 
Apart from acting as the synthetic equivalent of an ethyl anion synthon for nucleophilic addition, ethylmagnesium bromide may be used as a strong base to deprotonate various substrates such as alkynes:

RC≡CH  +  EtMgBr  →  RC≡CMgBr  +  EtH

In this application, ethylmagnesium bromide has been supplanted by the wide availability of organolithium reagents.

Preparation
Ethylmagnesium bromide is commercially available, usually as a solution in diethyl ether or tetrahydrofuran. It may be prepared in the normal manner of Grignard reagents — by reacting bromoethane with magnesium in diethyl ether:

EtBr + Mg → EtMgBr

References

Organomagnesium compounds